Kyle (Lakota: phežúta ȟaká; "Branched Medicine") is a census-designated place (CDP) in Oglala Lakota County, South Dakota, United States. Its population was 943 at the 2020 census. Located within the Pine Ridge Indian Reservation of the Oglala Lakota, it is one of two settlements which are closest to the North American continental pole of inaccessibility.

The community was named for James H. Kyle, a Senator from South Dakota.

Geography
Kyle is located at  (43.426652, -102.175677).

Demographics

 
As of the census of 2000, there were 970 people, 205 households, and 168 families residing in the CDP. 
The population density was 481.3 people per square mile (185.4/km2).  There were 219 housing units at an average density of 108.7/sq mi (41.9/km2). The racial makeup of the CDP was 94.43% Native American, 5.15% White, and 0.41% from two or more races. Hispanic or Latino of any race were 1.13% of the population.

There were 205 households, out of which 53.7% had children under the age of 18 living with them, 36.6% were married couples living together, 34.1% had a female householder with no husband present, and 17.6% were non-families. 13.7% of all households were made up of individuals, and 1.0% had someone living alone who was 65 years of age or older.  The average household size was 4.46 and the average family size was 4.88.

In the CDP, the population was spread out, with 45.4% under the age of 18, 9.9% from 18 to 24, 29.4% from 25 to 44, 11.5% from 45 to 64, and 3.8% who were 65 years of age or older.  The median age was 21 years. For every 100 females, there were 97.2 males.  For every 100 females age 18 and over, there were 105.4 males.

The median income for a household in the CDP was $26,750, and the median income for a family was $27,000. Males had a median income of $21,953 versus $13,710 for females. The per capita income for the CDP was $7,415.  About 42.1% of families and 35.7% of the population were below the poverty line, including 43.2% of those under age 18 and 17.4% of those age 65 or over.

Education
The Little Wound School is administered by the tribe in association with the Bureau of Indian Education (BIE). It has elementary, middle, and high school grades, with a total of more than 900 students, who are primarily Oglala Lakota in ethnicity.

Oglala Lakota College is a tribal college in Kyle operated by the Lakota Nation.

References

External links
 Oglala Lakota College

Census-designated places in Oglala Lakota County, South Dakota
Census-designated places in South Dakota
Pine Ridge Indian Reservation